Tai Po Mei is a village in Tai Po District, Hong Kong.

Administration
Tai Po Mei is a recognized village under the New Territories Small House Policy.

See also
 2018 Hong Kong bus accident

References

External links

 Delineation of area of existing village Tai Po Mei (Tai Po) for election of resident representative (2019 to 2022)

Villages in Tai Po District, Hong Kong